Jodłownik  is a village in Limanowa County, Lesser Poland Voivodeship, in southern Poland. It is the seat of the gmina (administrative district) called Gmina Jodłownik.

References

Villages in Limanowa County
Kraków Voivodeship (1919–1939)